The Carnegie Mellon CyLab Security and Privacy Institute is a computer security research center at Carnegie Mellon University. Founded in 2003 as a university-wide research center, it involves more than 50 faculty and 100 graduate students from different departments and schools within the university. It is "one of the largest university-based cyber security research and education centers in the U.S."

CyLab works with the CERT Coordination Center as well as US-CERT on matters relating to cybersecurity. The institute is often cited for its security and privacy research.

picoCTF
picoCTF is a cybersecurity capture the flag competition hosted by CyLab. Established in 2013, the event is run annually over a period of two weeks and is geared towards high schoolers, billing itself as the largest high school cybersecurity event in the United States; the inaugural edition had 6,000 participants and 39,000 people competed in 2019. The challenges, which are modeled around real-life cybersecurity problems, are themed around a different storyline each year. The program aims to get high schoolers interested in computer security, offering cash prizes.

References

Schools and departments of Carnegie Mellon
Computer security organizations
2003 establishments in Pennsylvania
Educational institutions established in 2003

External links
CyLab website